The 49th Army Corps was an Army corps in the Imperial Russian Army.

Part of
11th Army: 1917
12th Army: 1917
Corps of the Russian Empire

Commanders 
 Vladimir Selivachyov (April - July 1917)
 S. N. Liupov (July - September 1917)
 N. A. Savielev (after September 1917)